Speleonychia is a genus of armoured harvestmen in the family Cladonychiidae. There is at least one described species in Speleonychia, S. sengeri. It is found in Washington state.

References

Further reading

 
 
 

Harvestmen
Articles created by Qbugbot